Frederick William Gamble  (1869 – 1926) was a zoologist and author.

After secondary education at Manchester Grammar School, Gamble attended the University of Manchester, where he graduated in 1891 B.Sc. and obtained in 1982 the Bishop Berkeley Fellowship.  He then studied at Leipzig University. Returning to Manchester, he received in 1893 his M.Sc. At the University of Manchester, he became in 1893 junior lecturer and demonstrator in zoology, in 1895 senior lecturer and demonstrator, and afterwards was promoted to assistant-director of the University Zoological Laboratories. He received his D.Sc. in 1900. He was Secretary of the Manchester Literary and Philosophical Society from 1905 to 1908. In 1909 he was appointed to the chair of zoology at the University of Birmingham and continued in the chair until his death.

Gamble was elected F.R.S. in 1907. He was president of the Zoology Section at the British Association meeting at Toronto in 1924.

Selected publications
 
 with J. H. Ashworth: 
 
 . This book is part of the series Home University Library of Modern Knowledge published by Williams and Norgate.
 as editor: A Junior Course of Practical Zoology by A. Milnes Marshall and C. Herbert Hurst (born 1833). Gamble edited the fifth (1899), sixth (1905), and seventh (1912) editions.

References

English zoologists
English writers
1869 births
1926 deaths
People educated at Manchester Grammar School
Academics of the University of Manchester
Academics of the University of Birmingham
19th-century British zoologists
20th-century British zoologists
Fellows of the Royal Society
Manchester Literary and Philosophical Society